Hansard Global plc is a financial services business operating out of the Isle of Man. It is listed on the London Stock Exchange.

History
The Company was formed by Dr Leonard Polonsky, an American, as the Liberty Life Assurance Company, in 1970. It was first listed on the London Stock Exchange in 2006 in a £357 million flotation which generated £99 million for its founder. Its fund range includes portfolios from Fidelity International and Alquity.

On 12 March 2021 the company announced that after 8 years as CEO and 30 years with the company, Gordon Marr would be retiring by the end of 2021.

Operations
The Group is involved in the provision of life assurance services primarily in the Far East, Latin America and Middle East.

References

External links
 Official site

Financial services companies established in 1970
Financial services companies of the Isle of Man
Companies listed on the London Stock Exchange
1970 establishments in the Isle of Man
Companies of the Isle of Man